Edward Albert Edwards (22 December 19142 July 1995) was an Australian rules footballer who played in the VFL between 1938 and 1945 for the Richmond Football Club.

He then moved to Tasmania to play for the Longford (1946) and Clarence (1947–52) clubs. Edwards also represented Tasmania at the 1950 Brisbane Carnival.

References 

 Hogan P: The Tigers Of Old, Richmond FC, Melbourne 1996

External links
 
 

Richmond Football Club players
Richmond Football Club Premiership players
Sandhurst Football Club players
Longford Football Club players
Clarence Football Club players
Australian rules footballers from Bendigo
1914 births
1995 deaths
One-time VFL/AFL Premiership players